Tayla Bresland (born 4 February 1996) is a retired Australian rules footballer who played for Fremantle and West Coast in the AFL Women's (AFLW) competition.

AFLW career

Fremantle
Bresland was drafted by Fremantle with their seventh selection and fifty-second overall in the 2016 AFL Women's draft. She made her debut in the thirty-two point loss to the Western Bulldogs at VU Whitten Oval in the opening round of the 2017 season. She played every match in her debut season to finish with seven matches.

West Coast
In August 2020, Bresland was traded to West Coast for the 46th pick of the 2020 AFL Women's draft. In March 2022, Bresland retired to focus on her career as a carpenter and Air Force Reservist.

References

External links 

1996 births
Living people
Fremantle Football Club (AFLW) players
West Coast Eagles (AFLW) players
Australian rules footballers from Western Australia